Abuzariyeh (also Romanized as Abūẕarīyeh; also known as Abūz̄arābād, Kahūr Moshkak, Kūramshakak, and Kūr-e Moshkak) is a village in Rudbar Rural District, in the Central District of Rudbar-e Jonubi County, Kerman Province, Iran. At the 2006 census, its population was 278, in 56 families.

References 

Populated places in Rudbar-e Jonubi County